The Shady Well Stakes is a Thoroughbred horse race run annually since 2000 at Woodbine Racetrack in Toronto, Ontario, Canada. Held in mid July, the ungraded stakes race is open to two-year-old fillies foaled in the Province of Ontario. A sprint race, it is contested over a distance of  furlongs on Polytrack synthetic dirt, it currently offers a purse of $118,500. It was raced in two divisions in 1958 and 1968.

Inaugurated in 1956, the race is named in honour of Edward F. Seagram's filly, Shady Well, whose career wins included three straight Durham Cup Handicaps during 1932-1934.

Since inception, the race has been contested at a variety of distances:
  furlongs : 1980-2005, 2007 to present (at Woodbine Racetrack)
 5 furlongs : 2006 (at Woodbine Racetrack)
 6 furlongs : 1974-1979 (at Woodbine Racetrack)
  furlongs : 1956-1959, (at Woodbine Racetrack), 1969-1972 (at Fort Erie Racetrack), 1973 (at Woodbine Racetrack)
 7 furlongs : 1960-1967 (at Woodbine Racetrack), 1968 (at Greenwood Raceway)

Records
Speed  record: 
 1:03.14 - Roxy Gap (2010)

Most wins by an owner:
 6 - Kinghaven Farms (1974, 1980, 1982, 1983, 1984, 2000)

Most wins by a jockey:
 4 - Avelino Gomez (1966, 1972, 1976, 1978)
 4 - David Clark (1981, 1989, 1998, 2005)
 4 - Robert Landry (1994, 1996, 1999, 2002)

Most wins by a trainer:
 4 - Frank H. Merrill, Jr. (1958, 1965, 1972, 1976)
 4 - John Tammaro, Jr. (1980, 1982, 1983, 1984)

Winners of the Shady Well Stakes

* In 1978 Susie Bigger finished first but was disqualified and set back to second.

References
 The Shady Well Stakes at Pedigree Query

Restricted stakes races in Canada
Flat horse races for two-year-old fillies
Recurring sporting events established in 1956
Woodbine Racetrack